ChemInform was an indexing and abstracting service and database in chemistry. The service published abstracts related to organic, organometallic, inorganic and physical chemistry.

Products

ChemInform: Selected Abstracts in Chemistry

The abstracts were published in ChemInform: Selected Abstracts in Chemistry from 1970 to 2016. It was originally published in two parts as Chemischer Informationsdienst: anorganische und physikalische Chemie and Chemischer Informationsdienst: organische Chemie, which merged in 1972 into the single Chemischer Informationsdienst, which superseded in part Chemisches Zentralblatt. The publication acquired its final title in 1987.

ChemInform RX
A reaction database ChemInform RX (CIRX) enabled users to search for specific reactions published in ChemInform journal.

SPORE
SPORE (Solid Phase Organic Reactions) was a database for synthetic pathways via polymer-bound organic compounds, with extensive data on each individual reaction.

See also
Chemical Abstracts Service

References

External links
ChemInform: Selected Abstracts in Chemistry

Bibliographic databases and indexes
Chemical databases